James Cox may refer to:

Politics
 James Cox (Nova Scotia politician) (died 1805), merchant and politician in Nova Scotia
 James Cox (New Jersey politician) (1753–1810), United States Representative from New Jersey, 1809–1810
 James M. Cox (1870–1957), American politician, Governor of Ohio and Democratic presidential nominee in 1920
 James P. Cox (1804–1866), member of the first legislature of the Wisconsin Territory

Media
 James Cox (director) (born 1975), American film director
 James Cox (journalist), radio and television presenter and correspondent for the BBC

Sports
 James Cox (quarterback) (born 1983), starting quarterback for the Colorado Buffaloes football team, 2005–2006
 James Cox (baseball), Negro league baseball player
 James Allen Cox (born 1977), American professional wrestler better known as James Storm
 J. B. Cox (James Brent Cox, born 1984), American baseball player
 Jamie Cox (born 1969), cricketer
 Jamie Cox (boxer) (born 1986), professional boxer from Swindon
 James Cox (soccer) (born 2000), American soccer player

Business
 James Cox (inventor) (1723–1800), British jeweller, goldsmith and entrepreneur
 James M. Cox Jr. (1903–1974), American businessman, chair of Cox Enterprises
 James H. Cox (1810–1877), American teacher, businessman, legislator, judge

Others
 James Cox (labourer) (1846–1925), New Zealand labourer, flax worker, swagger and agricultural worker
 James Charles Cox (1834–1912), Australian physician and naturalist
 James L. Cox (born 1942), American cardiothoracic surgeon
 James Renshaw Cox (1886–1951), American Roman Catholic priest and 1932 candidate for President of the United States
 James Cox (priest) (1654–1716), Irish Anglican priest

See also
 Jim Cox (disambiguation)
 James Cocke, mayor of Williamsburg, Virginia
 James Cox Aikins (1823–1904), Canadian politician